"Not the Only One" is a 1991 song by Bonnie Raitt, written by Paul Brady and produced by Don Was from the album Luck of the Draw. The single reached No. 34 in the United States and No. 13 in Canada, topping the latter country's Adult Contemporary chart.

Charts

Weekly charts

Year-end charts

References

1991 songs
1992 singles
Bonnie Raitt songs
Capitol Records singles
Songs written by Paul Brady
Song recordings produced by Don Was